Amitabh Bajpai (born 31 July, 1974) is an Indian politician and member of Uttar Pradesh Legislative Assembly.

Amitabh Bajpai of SP has won the Arya Nagar seat of Uttar Pradesh legislative assembly in 2017. 

The Bharatiya Janata Party (BJP) defeated the Samajwadi Party (SP) in the 2012 Assembly elections. Salil Vishnoi, the winning BJP candidate, got 51,200 votes. The nearest contender was Jitendra Bahadur Singh of SP who got 35,789 votes.
The ruling Samajwadi Party (SP) in Uttar Pradesh had in 2012 won 224 seats spread across 75 districts. It has tied-up with Congress this time in the contest against BJP and BSP.
Elections to 403 seats of Uttar Pradesh were held over 7 phases from 4 February to 8 March.
Exit polls had predicted the BJP emerging first in Uttar Pradesh with the Samajwadi Party- Congress alliance emerging second and Mayawati's Bahujan Samaj Party emerging a distant third.

References

Uttar Pradesh MLAs 2017–2022
Living people
Politicians from Kanpur
Samajwadi Party politicians
1974 births
Bundelkhand University alumni
Uttar Pradesh MLAs 2022–2027